Swan Creek is a  long 2nd order tributary to the Mispillion River in Kent County, Delaware.

Course
Swan Creek is formed at the outlet of Tubmill Pond about 0.5 miles south of Lynch Heights, Delaware.  Swan Creek then flows east to meet the Mispillion River at New Wharf, Delaware.

Watershed
Swan Creek drains  of area, receives about 45.7 in/year of precipitation, has a topographic wetness index of 555.50 and is about 8.8% forested.

See also
List of Delaware rivers

Maps

References

Rivers of Delaware
Rivers of Kent County, Delaware
Tributaries of Delaware Bay